The Council for Higher Education Accreditation (CHEA) is a United States organization of degree-granting colleges and universities. It identifies its purpose as providing national advocacy for academic quality through accreditation in order to certify the quality of higher education accrediting organizations, including regional, faith-based, private, career, and programmatic accrediting organizations.

The organization has accredited colleges and universities as members, and currently recognizes approximately 60 accrediting organizations. CHEA is based in Washington, DC. CHEA is a member of International Network for Quality Assurance Agencies in Higher Education (INQAAHE).

History
Established in 1996, CHEA is the successor to several earlier national nongovernmental associations formed to coordinate the U.S. accreditation process for higher education. In 1974, the Federation of Regional Accrediting Commissions of Higher Education (FRACHE; an association of regional accreditors) and the National Commission on Accrediting (an association of specialized and national accreditation agencies) had merged to form the Council on Postsecondary Accreditation (COPA), which had the purpose of ensuring the quality of accreditation.

In 1993, COPA was dissolved because of tensions among the different types of accreditation agencies that formed its membership—ultimately the result of the increasing problems for higher education in the 1980s and 1990s. Problems with tuition increases, scandals, and doubts about the value of postsecondary higher education plagued all parts of the higher education sector.

In particular, Congressional investigations of soaring student loan defaults and student aid abuses were highly critical of the laxity of accreditation and accreditation processes.

Consequently, the 1992 amendments to the Higher Education Act of 1965 included Program Integrity provisions designed to strengthen the gatekeeping triad for student loan guarantees and financial aid (i.e., state licensing bodies, accreditation associations, and Federal government). The higher education community viewed with alarm the establishment of State Postsecondary Review Entities (SPREs), which were given accrediting powers under special conditions. "When campus lobbyists heard about the legislation and realized that non-governmental accreditation was being replaced by a federal-state agency evaluation of institutions, including assessments of academic quality never before carried out by the government, they 'went apoplectic', as one observer put it."

Early in 1993, the regional accreditors voted to leave COPA, indicating their dissatisfaction with COPA's political representation in the U.S. Congress, which representation was widely viewed as ineffective, particularly in regard to the new legislation establishing the SPREs. In April 1993, COPA voted to disband itself by the end of the year.

Work by the National Policy Board on Higher Education Institutional Accreditation (NPB), and other groups laid the groundwork for a national successor to COPA. Among their concerns were establishing a more grassroots membership, billing and fees, and advisory role of the accrediting associations, improving the public image of accrediting, and improving the ability to lobby the Federal government.

CHEA's immediate predecessor was the Council for Recognition of Postsecondary Accreditation (CORPA), which was formed following the dissolution of COPA. CHEA grandfathered in those accrediting associations recognized by COPA, provided that more than half the institutions that they accredited granted degrees.

Information resources
Each accreditor recognized by CHEA is independent, which means that accreditation requirements vary from group to group.  CHEA maintains a website that contains a searchable database to check the accreditation status of recognized accreditation agencies, accredited schools, or schools currently in the process of getting accreditation (i.e., "candidates" for accreditation).  CHEA's "user agreement for publications of the Council for Higher Education Accreditation" states that it does not guarantee that all accredited schools are listed in the database.

In 2012 CHEA launched the CHEA International Quality Group (CIQG) to advance understanding of international quality assurance and to promote high-quality higher education through international accreditation bodies worldwide. The CIQG provides a database of recognized accreditation agencies globally. It is a non-profit, non-governmental association focused on U.S. and non-U.S. accreditation and higher education quality assurance worldwide.

Board of directors
CHEA is led by a board of directors that consists of 20 members, including presidents of colleges and universities, other institutional representatives, and members of the public. As of 2022, Gena Glickman, Ph.D., President Emerita of Manchester Community College, is the chair of the CHEA Board of Directors.

The staff president of CHEA is Cynthia Jackson-Hammond.

Viewpoints

CHEA has voiced opposition to various accreditation reform efforts by the U.S. Department of Education.

The organization faces challenges in helping the public to better understand accreditation in the U.S.,  and distinguish between the recognition of accrediting agencies conducted by the U.S. Secretary of Education, and those recognized by private nongovernmental associations, such as CHEA.

Relationship to government

CHEA recognition of accreditors differs from the recognition by the U.S. Secretary of Education, required for Title IV (HEA) student financial aid eligibility and loan guarantees.

For the purpose of state government oversight of higher education, the state of Oregon authorizes accreditation organizations recognized by both the U.S. Department of Education and CHEA to operate in the state. However, organizations that are recognized by CHEA and not also by the Department of Education may operate only with oversight from the Oregon Student Assistance Commission.

CHEA wishes to prevent European-style ministry-based administration of higher education accreditation in the U.S.

See also
 Higher education accreditation in the United States
 List of recognized higher education accreditation organizations
 National Association of Credential Evaluation Services

References

External links

 
 CHEA, Resolution of the Board of Directors, May 7, 2007, Washington D. C.
 Doug Lederman, Dissent and a Disputed Phone Call April 27, 2007, Inside Higher Ed
 Vickie Schray, Assuring Quality in Higher Education: Key Issues and Questions for Changing Accreditation in the United States, Issue Paper, The Secretary of Education’s Commission on the Future of Higher Education (Fourth in a series of Issue Papers released at the request of Chairman Charles Miller to inform the work of the Commission), U.S. Department of Education, Washington D.C. No date.
 Jane Wellman, Recognition of Accreditation Organizations: A Comparison of Policy & Practice of Voluntary Accreditation and The United States Department of  Education, January 1998.
 Robert Atwell, James Rogers, Independence, Accreditation, and the Public Interest, Special Report on Accreditation'', October 1994, National Policy Board on Higher Education Institutional Accreditation (NBP). Available at ERIC.
 U.S. Senate, Abuses in Federal Student Aid Programs, Permanent Subcommittee on Investigations, Report 102-58, May 17, 1991, Washington, D.C.

1996 establishments in the United States
Organizations established in 1996
Higher education in the United States
Educational organizations based in the United States
Higher education accreditation